Biju Menon (born 9 September 1970) is an Indian actor who predominantly appears in Malayalam films, and also has a few Tamil and Telugu film credits. He made his debut in the 1994 Malayalam film Puthran. In a career spanning over two decades, he has appeared in over 150 films, and has won one National film award for Best Supporting Actor, three Kerala State Film Awards including one best actor, two Filmfare Awards South and nine Asianet Film Awards.He got the Kerala State Film Award for Best Actor in 2021 for the film Aarkkariyam. 

Biju Menon's popular characters include Mahendra Varma in Mannar Mathai Speaking (1995), Sharath in Azhakiya Ravanan (1996), Akhilachandran in Krishnagudiyil Oru Pranayakalathu (1997), SP Firoz Mohammed in Pathram (1999), Uthaman in Kannezhuthi Pottum Thottu (1999), Vishnu in Madhuranombarakattu (2000), Rajeevan in Meghamalhar (2001), C.I. Bhadran K. Menon in Shivam (2002), Nandakumar Pothuval in T. D. Dasan Std. VI B (2010), Jose in Marykkundoru Kunjaadu (2010), Philip Idikkula in Seniors (2011), Suku in Ordinary (2012), Rishikesh in Run Baby Run (2012), Shibu/Fr. Sebu in Romans (2013), Mamachan in Vellimoonga (2014), Lt. Zachariah in Anarkali (2015), Kuttiyappan in Leela (2016), Baiju in Rakshadhikari Baiju Oppu (2017), IRS officer P.L Thomas/Sherlock Toms in Sherlock Toms (2017), Manoharan in Adhyarathri (2019), and S.I. Ayyapan Nair in Ayyappanum Koshiyum (2020).

Early life and education
Menon was born on 9 September 1970 to Madathiparambil P. N. Balakrishna Pillai and Malathiyamma Menon. He has four brothers: Soman, Suresh, Rajendran and Sreekumar. 

Menon had his primary education from J.T.S Technical High School, Thrissur district in Kerala, India. He pursued degree in commerce from St. Thomas College, Thrissur. He also did Master of Social Work (MSW).

Acting career

Biju Menon started his acting career through Malayalam television serials such as Ningalude Swantham Chanthu, Parudeesayilekulla Patha and Mikhayelinte Santhathikal. He made his debut in films with Puthran, the debut film of Jude Attipetty and the sequel of Mikhayelinte Santhathikal. He acted in a number of movies as the villain or the secondary hero. During the late 1990s, he was considered to be a superstar in making. But most of the films with Biju Menon as the hero failed at the box office, in spite of his good performance, though his roles as second hero were popular. He acted with Suresh Gopi in hit movies like Pathram, F. I. R. and Chinthamani Kolacase. During the later 1990s and early 2000s he appeared in a few offbeat movies with directors like T. V. Chandran, Lenin Rajendran and Kamal in the films Mazha, Madhuranombarakkattu, Anyar and Meghamalhar.

He has appeared in the majority of the films made by director Lal Jose, including Oru Maravathoor Kanavu, Chandranudikkunna Dikhil, Randaam Bhavam, Pattalam, Rasikan, Chanthupottu, Mulla and Spanish Masala. He won the Kerala State Film Award for Second Best Actor twice in his acting career for his roles as Akhilachandran in Krishnagudiyil Oru Pranayakalathu (1997) and Nanda Kumar in T. D. Dasan Std. VI B(2010). He has also acted as antagonist in Tamil films and has been successful in films like Majaa and Thambi. In May 2018, he proved his versatility as a stage artist and singer in Madhuram 18 Mega Stage Show performing in 15 stages in U.S.A and Canada.

Personal life 

He is married to the former Malayalam actress Samyuktha Varma, on 21 November 2002 who co-starred with him in Mazha, Madhuranombarakkattu and Meghamalhar. The couple has a son Daksh Dharmik, born on 14 September 2006.

Filmography

As actor

Malayalam

Telugu

Tamil

Kannada

As Dubbing artist
Makaramanju – Voice for Santhosh Shivan
Vismayam (Malayalam Dubbed Version of Manamantha) – Voice for P. Ravi Shankar

Television
 Ningalude Swantham Chanthu (Doordarshan)
 Mikhayelinte Santhathikal (Doordarshan)
 Parudeesayilekulla Patha (Doordarshan)

Awards

References

External links
 

Male actors from Thrissur
Living people
Kerala State Film Award winners
1970 births
People from Thrissur
Male actors in Malayalam cinema
Indian male film actors
Best Supporting Actor National Film Award winners
Filmfare Awards South winners
20th-century Indian male actors
21st-century Indian male actors
Indian male television actors
Male actors in Hindi television
Indian male voice actors